Tuškanac is a neighborhood located in Gornji Grad - Medveščak city district of Zagreb, Croatia. It has a population of 2,455 (2011). It is best known for its parks and the Tuškanac cinema.

Apparently, its name derives from the name of Tuscany. It is assumed that it refers to Tuscan immigrants to Zagreb, some of whom have been recorded in the 14th century.

References

External links
 

Neighbourhoods of Zagreb
Gornji Grad–Medveščak